is the mayor of Utsunomiya, Tochigi in Japan. A graduate of Meiji University, he has been serving his first term of mayor since November 29, 2004.

References 
 

1961 births
Living people
Mayors of places in Tochigi Prefecture